Live at the Vision Festival is an album by American jazz saxophonist Jemeel Moondoc, which was recorded live at the 2001 Vision Festival and released on Ayler Records, a Swedish label founded by Jan Ström and Åke Bjurhamn. It was the second recording by the Jus Grew Orchestra, a large ensemble founded by Moondoc in the early 80s.

Reception

The AllMusic review states "Despite some fine soloing, including a typically joyous flight of fancy from Moondoc himself and several impressive features for tenor saxophonist Zane Massey, it's a relatively no-risk affair, underpinned by a rhythm section that seems at times to be just going through the motions."

The Penguin Guide to Jazz says "The music is fine and fiery... The sound isn't exceptional but gives a faithful representation of Moondoc's philosophy."

Track listing
All compositions by Jemeel Moondoc
"Opulent Continuum" - 8:43
"The Blue Dog - Blues for Earl Cross" - 14:32
"Variation of a Riff" - 14:06
"Cosmic Tabernacle" - 8:36

Personnel
Jemeel Moondoc - alto sax, conduction
Zane Massey - tenor sax
Michael Marcus - baritone sax
Roy Campbell - trumpet
Nathan Breedlove - trumpet
Steve Swell - trombone
Tyrone Hill - trombone
Bern Nix - guitar
John Voigt - bass
Gerald Cleaver - drums

References

2003 live albums
Jemeel Moondoc live albums
Albums recorded at the Vision Festival
Ayler Records live albums